Pooran Prakash is an Indian politician and a member of the 16th Legislative Assembly of India. He represents the Baldev constituency of Uttar Pradesh and is a member of the Bharatiya Janata Party.

Early life and  education
Pooran Prakash was born in Mathura district . He attended the Babu Shivnath Agrawal College and attained Bachelor of Laws degree. Prakash belongs to the scheduled caste community.

Political career
Prakash has been a MLA for three terms. He represented the Baldev constituency and was a member of the Rashtriya Lok Dal political party. On 26 December 2016, Prakash left the RLD and joined the Bharatiya Janata Party.

On 9 August 2017, Prakash suffered serious blood pressure problems after donating blood, after which he was kept under observation for three hours while doctors attempted to bring his blood pressure back to normal. In his tenure many developments have taken place in Baldev constituency. He was the favorite of people of Baldev constituency.

Posts held

See also
 Baldev
 Goverdhan
 Sixteenth Legislative Assembly of Uttar Pradesh
 Uttar Pradesh Legislative Assembly

References 

Rashtriya Lok Dal politicians
Uttar Pradesh MLAs 1991–1993
Uttar Pradesh MLAs 2007–2012
Uttar Pradesh MLAs 2012–2017
Uttar Pradesh MLAs 2017–2022
Uttar Pradesh MLAs 2022–2027
People from Mathura district
1955 births
Living people
Bharatiya Janata Party politicians from Uttar Pradesh
Janata Dal politicians